Leslie Charles Colvin (February 8, 1919 – September 7, 2006) was a Canadian ice hockey goaltender who played in one National Hockey League game for the Boston Bruins during the 1948–49 season, on January 22, 1949 against the Montreal Canadiens. The rest of his career, which lasted from 1939 to 1953, was spent in various minor leagues.

Career statistics

Regular season and playoffs

See also
List of players who played only one game in the NHL

External links

1919 births
2006 deaths
Boston Bruins players
Canadian expatriate ice hockey players in the United States
Canadian ice hockey goaltenders
Ice hockey people from Ontario
Los Angeles Monarchs players
New York Rovers players
Northern Ontario Hockey Association players
Ontario Hockey Association Senior A League (1890–1979) players
Oshawa Generals players
Portland Eagles players
Shawinigan-Falls Cataracts (QSHL) players
Sportspeople from Oshawa
Vancouver Canucks (WHL) players
Washington Eagles players